is a city in Kamikawa Subprefecture, Hokkaido, Japan.

, the city has an estimated population of 28,373 and a population density of 53 persons per km2 (140 persons per sq. mi.).

On March 27, 2006, the town of Fūren was merged into Nayoro.

History
1909: Kaminayoro village was founded.
1915: Kaminayoro village became Nayoro town.
1920: Chiebun village split off from Shimonayoro village.
1924: Shimokawa village was separated from Nayoro town.
1954: Nayoro town and Chiebun village was merged to form Nayoro town.
1956: Nayoro town became Nayoro city.
2006: Nayoro city and Fūren town was merged to form Nayoro city.

Education

Universities
 Nayoro City University

Junior colleges
 Nayoro City University Junior College

High schools
 Hokkaido Nayoro High School
 Hokkaido Nayoro Industry High School

Transportation

Rail
The Nayoro Main Line and Shimmei Line used to run from Nayoro Station.
 Sōya Main Line : Fūren - Nayorokōkō - Nayoro - Nisshin - Chiebun - Chihoku

Above are stations located in Nayoro.

Road
Nayoro is linked with National Route 40 linking Wakkanai and southern Hokkaido as well as the Hokkaidō Expressway linking with the island capital of Sapporo. Nayoro is bypassed to the west with the Nayoro Bypass (Route 40) serving two interchanges.

Climate
Nayoro has a wet and snowy warm-summer humid continental climate (Köppen climate classification Dfb). The climate retains warm and sometimes hot summers with very cold winters by Japanese standards, coupled with heavy sea-effect snowfall.

Culture

Mascot

He is a mochi alien who loves star watching and collecting toys. He carries a telescope all the time to study the stars. He is designed by Sakiko Yatani from Ebetsu and was named by Ayumi Hagiwara from Sapporo.

Sister cities and partner cities

International
 Lindsay, Ontario, Canada
 Dolinsk, Russia.

Within Japan
 Fujishima, Yamagata
 Suginami-ku, Tokyo

References

External links 

Official Website 

 
Cities in Hokkaido